Turkey Creek is a census-designated place in Navajo County, in the U.S. state of Arizona, on the Fort Apache Indian Reservation. The population was 294 at the 2010 census.

Demographics

As of the census of 2010, there were 294 people, 71 households, and 56 families living in the CDP.

Transportation
The White Mountain Apache Tribe operates the Fort Apache Connection Transit, which provides local bus service.

References

Census-designated places in Navajo County, Arizona
White Mountain Apache Tribe